The Mercedes-Benz OM601 engine is a 4 cylinder diesel automobile engine that was manufactured by Mercedes-Benz.

The commercial vehicle version had  in standard variants, the turbocharged version (OM601.970) in the V230 TD and Vito 110D had .

It is closely related to the 5 cylinder OM602 and the 6 cylinder OM603 engine families of the same era.

The OM601 was built with an aluminum head on an iron block. The camshafts and fuel injection pump are driven by a duplex chain from the crankshaft. A separate single row chain drives the oil pump from the crankshaft.

Fuel supply is indirect injection via a prechamber arrangement. The OM-601's injection pump is a mechanical fuel injection unit with a 5,150 RPM (+ or - 50 RPM) mechanical governor, automatic altitude compensation, and a 'load sensing' automatic idle speed control. The pump is lubricated by a connection to the engine oil circulation.

Use of the block heater was recommended in climates where it drops below  for long periods. 

The engine was used in the 208D 308D and 408D Mercedes-Benz T1 and later the Phase 1 308D Mercedes-Benz Sprinter

Images

OM601
Diesel engines by model

Straight-four engines